Kappa Tau Alpha is an American college honor society which recognizes academic excellence and promotes scholarship in journalism and mass communication. Membership must be earned by excellence in academic work at one of the colleges and universities which have chapters.

History
The seventh-oldest national honor society, KTA was founded at the University of Missouri in 1910 at the world's second oldest school of journalism.  KTA is the only journalism and mass communication society recognized by the Association of College Honor Societies and is one of 67 ACHS members.

When Kappa Tau Alpha was founded it was limited to only men. However, the society lapsed during World War I and when it was reorganized after the war it was broadened to allow women students.

Symbols
The emblem of Kappa Tau Alpha is the key, the oldest symbol of knowledge and communication, with a quill pen. The Greek letters mean "The Truth Will Prevail." The letters also suggest three English words: knowledge, truth and accuracy. The society's colors are light blue, signifying truth; and gold, emblematic of worth and high standards.

The society co-sponsors the Kappa Tau Alpha-AEJMC Awards luncheon at the annual convention of the Association for Education in Journalism and Mass Communication.

Notes

References
Kappa Tau Alpha website
KTA at the University of Missouri
  ACHS Kappa Tau Alpha entry
  Kappa Tau Alpha chapter list at ACHS

Honor societies
Association of College Honor Societies
Student organizations established in 1910
University of Missouri
1910 establishments in Missouri